Deep Creek is a  tributary of the Nanticoke River that rises in the Redden area and flows southwest towards Seaford, Delaware.

References

Rivers of Delaware
Tributaries of the Nanticoke River